This is a list of wars involving the Republic of El Salvador.

List

 
El Salvador
Wars